Hallett is a surname. Notable people with the surname include:

Andy Hallett (1975–2009), American actor
Benjamin F. Hallett (1797–1862), was a Massachusetts lawyer, first chairman of the Democratic National Committee
Cecil Hallett (1899–1994), British trade unionist
Christine Hallett (born 1949), British social scientist and academic
George Hallett (disambiguation), several people
Harold Foster Hallett (1886–1966), British philosopher
Heather Hallett (born 1949), retired English judge of the Court of Appeal 
Howard Hallett (1890–1970), Australian rugby league footballer
 Job H. Hallett (1855–1940) founded J. Hallett and Son, South Australian brickmakers
John Hallett (1772–1794) sailor on HMS Bounty, accompanied Bligh after mutiny
John Hallett (Australian politician) (1917–1999) Western Australian politician
John Hallett (South Australian politician), (1804–1868) businessman pastoralist and landowner
Judith P. Hallett, professor of Classics in the University of Maryland
Kevin Hallett (1929–2021), Australian swimmer
Macauley Hallett, English rugby league footballer
Mark Hallett (artist) (born 1947), illustrator specializing in dinosaurs
Mark Hallett (historian)  (born 1965), art historian specializing in British art
Moses Hallett (1834–1913), US federal judge
Samuel Hallett (1827–1864), railroad developer
Stanley Hallett (1930–1998), American urban planner
Thomas Hallett, son of Job H. Hallett

See also
Hallet (disambiguation)
Hallett (disambiguation)